Sir Geoffrey Stuart King KCB, KBE, CB, MC (1894-1981) was a British civil servant.

Family and education
King was the third and youngest son of Charles James Stuart King, a schoolmaster and footballer, and Violet Maud Hankin. He was the brother of Edward Leigh Stuart King and Sir Charles John Stuart King.

Born in Windom, Minnesota, he was educated at Felsted School from 1908 to 1910.

In 1920 King married Eileen May Tuke and had four sons.

Career
After leaving school, King became articled to a solicitor in Chard, Somerset. During the First World War he served with the West Somerset Yeomanry in France and was awarded the Military Cross in 1919.

King then joined the Treasury Solicitor's Department. In 1929 served on the secretariat for the Conference on the Operation of Dominion Legislation and Merchant Shipping Legislation, held prior to the 1930 Imperial Conference, and in 1930 he was a delegate to the League of Nations Codification Conference, held in The Hague.

In 1944 King became Secretary of the Unemployment Assistance Board and in 1948 he was appointed Deputy Secretary of the Ministry of National Insurance.

King was the author of The Ministry of Pensions and National Insurance (1958) and Caravanning Complete (1980).

Recognition
King was awarded the Military Cross in 1919 created CB in 1943. He was made a KBE in 1946 and a KCB in 1953.

References

External links

1894 births
1981 deaths
People educated at Felsted School
Recipients of the Military Cross
Commanders of the Order of the British Empire
Knights Commander of the Order of the British Empire
Knights Commander of the Order of the Bath
Companions of the Order of the Bath